Shailesh Manharbhai Parmar is an Indian politician from Indian National Congress. He won the 2007 Gujarat Legislative Assembly election from the Shaher Kotda Assembly Constituency. He won 2012  and 2017 Gujarat Legislative Assembly election from the Danilimda Vidhan Sabha constituency. Both these constituencies are reserved for candidates from Scheduled Castes. A complaint was filed stating that Parmar's caste certificate declaring him to be of a scheduled caste was fake. The plea was dismissed by local court in August 2013.

References 

Indian National Congress politicians from Gujarat
Gujarat MLAs 2007–2012
Gujarat MLAs 2012–2017
Gujarat MLAs 2017–2022
1969 births
Living people